The Rhino Band was a popular band in Kenya. It was in formed in 1946 from the Entertainment Unit of the King's African Rifles. Their music did not win any awards, however a prominent member, George Senoga-Zake, jointly composed the Kenyan National Anthem.

External links 
 https://web.archive.org/web/20070927234418/http://www.newvision.co.ug/D/8/25/483097

Kenyan musical groups
1946 establishments in Kenya